Elections to Gosport Council were held on 4 May 2006.  Half of the council was up for election and the Conservative party lost overall control of the council to no overall control.

After the election, the composition of the council was
Conservative 17
Liberal Democrat 9
Labour 8

Election result

Ward results

Alverstoke

Anglesey

Bridgemary North

Bridgemary South

Brockhurst

Christchurch

Elson

Forton

Grange

Hardway

Lee East

Lee West

Leesland

Peel Common

Privett

Rowner and Holbrook

Town

References

2006
2006 English local elections
2000s in Hampshire